Isla Mayor is a municipality  located in the province of Seville, Spain. According to the 2009 census, the municipality has a population of 5873 inhabitants.

Geography
The main village is Isla Mayor,  about 45 km south west of Sevilla, The small village of Poblado de Alfonso XIII is in the same municipality.
Isla Mayor separated from the municipality of Puebla del Rio in 1994.

Isla Mayor is situated in the Las Marismas (marshes) of the Bajo Guadalquivir River, of which one part forms part of the Doñana National Park. The land is formed from sediment at the mouth of the Guadalquivir river. It is crisscrossed by canals, and the land dedicated primarily to the cultivation of rice.

Previously just a seasonal settlement for workers in the rice harvest, it became a permanent settlement in 1956 with the establishment of a paper factory by the Instituto Nacional de Colonización. The village and municipality were known as Villafranco del Guadalquivir, in honour of the dictator General Franco. In 2000 the name was changed to Isla Mayor by popular vote.

See also
Guadalquivir Marshes

References

External links
Isla Mayor - Sistema de Información Multiterritorial de Andalucía

Municipalities of the Province of Seville